Serendipity is a live album recorded by composer and vibraphonist Walt Dickerson in Philadelphia in 1976 for the SteepleChase label.

Reception

Allmusic reviewer Stewart Mason said "Serendipity is a stunner for fans of Dickerson's more out-there sets".

Track listing
All compositions by Walt Dickerson
 "My Prayer" - 5:34		
 "Magnificent Glimps" - 14:55		
 "Serendipity" - 10:48		
 "This Way, Please" - 13:53		
 "Inner View" - 14:51 Bonus track on CD reissue

Personnel 
Walt Dickerson - vibraphone
Rudy McDaniel - electric bass
Edgar Bateman - drums

References 

1977 live albums
Walt Dickerson live albums
SteepleChase Records live albums